Estadio Municipal de Mollendo is a multi-use stadium in Mollendo, Peru. It is currently used mostly for football matches and is the home stadium of Atlético Mollendo of the Copa Perú. The stadium holds 5,000 spectators. 

Municipal de Mollendo
Buildings and structures in Arequipa Region